"Hello, Young Lovers" is a show tune from the 1951 Rodgers and Hammerstein musical, The King and I. It is sung by Anna, played by Gertrude Lawrence in the original Broadway production; by Valerie Hobson in the original London West End production; and by Deborah Kerr in the film version (although voiced-over by Marni Nixon).

The heroine Anna sings this song when she tells the wives of the King of Siam about her late husband, and sympathises with the plight of Tuptim, the Burmese slave girl and newest wife of the king.

Cover versions 
Among popular versions are those by:
Frank Sinatra - recorded March 2, 1951 with Axel Stordahl and His Orchestra., as well as on 1965's September of My Years.
Perry Como - recorded March 20, 1951 with Mitchell Ayres and His Orchestra. This charted briefly in the USA reaching No. 27 in the Billboard charts.
Bing Crosby - recorded April 9, 1951 with Victor Young and His Orchestra. 
Guy Lombardo (with vocal by Kenny Martin) (1951).
Andy Williams included his version of it on the 1959 album Andy Williams Sings Rodgers and Hammerstein.
Paul Anka had a significant revival in 1960, in the swinging Bobby Darin style on his album Paul Anka – Swings for Young Lovers.(#5Can)
Hank Mobley included an instrumental jazz version on his in 1961 recorded album Another Workout.
Nancy Wilson recorded it as the title track of her 1962 album with string arrangements by George Shearing.
Lesley Gore had a live version in 1965 on The Ed Sullivan Show while promoting her single "Look of Love".
The Temptations recorded it for their 1967 album The Temptations in a Mellow Mood.
Stevie Wonder recorded 1969 for album My Cherie Amour
Ella Fitzgerald - included in the 'live' album Ella in Budapest (1970).

References

1951 songs
1960 singles
Songs with music by Richard Rodgers
Songs with lyrics by Oscar Hammerstein II
Perry Como songs
Nancy Wilson (jazz singer) songs
Andy Williams songs
Paul Anka songs
Songs from The King and I